Even Hammer Holmboe (18 November 1792 – 23 December 1859) was a Norwegian politician.

Personal life
He was born in Trondenes as the son of bailiff Jens Holmboe (1752–1804) and his wife Anna Margrethe Irgens (1766–1851). He had several brothers and sisters. His brothers Hans and Leonhard Christian became involved in politics, so did his nephew Jens Holmboe.

In 1823 he married Maren Johanne Rønning, who hailed from Lofoten. The couple had five sons and five daughters.

Career
He was elected to the Norwegian Parliament in 1839, representing the constituency of Finmarkens Amt (which at that time included Finnmark and Troms). He served only one term.

He worked as a merchant and vice consul.

References

1792 births
1859 deaths
Members of the Storting
Troms politicians
Norwegian merchants
19th-century Norwegian businesspeople
Even Hammer